Arjuni Morgaon is one of the 288 Vidhan Sabha constituency of Maharashtra state in India. This Constituency is one of the three Constituencies located in the Gondia district.

It is part of the Bhandara-Gondiya Lok Sabha constituency along with five other Vidhan Sabha segments, namely Sakoli, Bhandara, Gondia, Tumsar and Tirora.

Geographical scope
The constituency comprises Sadak-Arjuni tehsil, parts of Goregaon tehesil, Revenue Circle Mohadi and Arjuni Morgaon tehsil as well as subdivision.

Representatives
2009: Rajkumar Badole 
2014: Rajkumar Badole represented the Arjuni-Morgaon assembly constituency and is a former Cabinet Minister and district guardian minister of Maharashtra. He belongs to the Bharatiya Janata Party.
2019: Manohar Chandrikapure of Nationalist Congress Party won in the 2019 Maharashtra Legislative Assembly election.

References

Assembly constituencies of Maharashtra